Dulamyn Puntsag is a former judge of the Supreme Court of Mongolia.

External links
 Supreme Court of Mongolia
 https://web.archive.org/web/20150123151318/http://www.news.mn/content/98219.shtm 

Mongolian lawyers
Living people
People from Ömnögovi Province
Year of birth missing (living people)
National University of Mongolia alumni